Victor Aronsson (born September 18, 1992) is a Swedish professional ice hockey defenceman currently playing for Almtuna IS of the HockeyAllsvenskan.

Aronsson made his Swedish Hockey League debut playing with Karlskrona HK during the 2015-16 SHL season.

References

External links

1992 births
Living people
Almtuna IS players
Karlskrona HK players
Modo Hockey players
Sportspeople from Uppsala
Swedish ice hockey defencemen
Wings HC Arlanda players